The following is a list of academicians, both past and present, who are widely renowned for their groundbreaking contributions to the field of educational psychology.

A 
 Patricia Alexander
 John Robert Anderson (born 1947)
 Richard C. Anderson (born 1934)
 Chris Argyris (1923–2013)
 Elliot Aronson 
 Richard C. Atkinson (born 1929)
 David Ausubel (1918–2008)
 Abraham Harold Maslow

B 
 Albert Bandura (1925–2021)
 Russell Barkley
 Carl Bereiter
 David Berliner
 Ellen Bialystok 
 John B. Biggs 
 Alfred Binet (1857–1911)
 Benjamin Bloom (1913–1999)
 Guy Bond
 Hilda Borko
 Ann Brown (1943–1999)
 Jerome Bruner (1915–2016)

C 
 Donald T. Campbell (1916–1996)
 Idit Harel Caperton (born 1958)
 John Bissell Carroll (1916–2003)
 Nancy Cole
 Allan Collins
 Lee Cronbach (1916–2001)
 Carl Jung
 DC Carp

D 
 John Dewey (1859–1952)
 Andrea diSessa
 Stewart Donaldson

E 
 Robert L. Ebel (born 1942)
 Kieran Egan
 Noel Entwistle
 Dorothy Espelage (born 1968)

F 
 Charles Ferster (1922–1981)
 Reuven Feuerstein (1921–2014)
 John H. Flavell (born 1928)

G 
 Nathaniel Gage (1917–2008)
 Robert M. Gagné (1916–2002)
 Howard Gardner (born 1943)
 David C. Geary
 Robert Glaser
 Gene V. Glass (born 1940)
 Anthony Gregorc 
 Loren Grey (1915–2007)

H 
 G. Stanley Hall (1844–1924)
 Diane F. Halpern 
 Karen R. Harris
 Michael Hogg
 John L. Holland
 Klaus Holzkamp (1927–1995)
 Lois Holzman
 J. McVicker Hunt

J 
 William James (1842–1910)
 Arthur Jensen (1923–2012)
 Charles Hubbard Judd (1873–1946)

K 
 Alan S. Kaufman (born 1944)
 Kenneth Koedinger (born 1962)
 Lawrence Kohlberg (1927–1987)
 David A. Kolb (born 1939)
 David Krathwohl

L 
 Nadine Lambert (1926–2006)
 Jean Lave
 Aleksei N. Leontiev (1903–1979)
 Alan Lesgold
 Robert L. Linn

M 
 Herbert W. Marsh
 Ferenc Marton (born 1939)
 Richard Mayer
 Maria Montessori (1870 - 1952)

N 
 Lilli Nielsen (1926–2013)

O 
 Angela O'Donnell
 Joy Osofsky

P 
 Gordon Pask (1928–1996)
 Roy Pea 
 Eva Bendix Petersen
 Jean Piaget (1896-1980)
 Paul Pintrich (1953–2003)

R 
 Joseph Renzulli (born 1936)
 Lauren Resnick
 James Rest
 Cecil Reynolds
 Carl Rogers (1902–1987)

S 
 Roger Säljö (born 1948)
 Gavriel Salomon 
 Marlene Scardamalia
 Dale Schunk
 Michael Scriven (born 1928)
 Carl Seashore (1866–1949)
 Marilyn Mailman Segal
 Richard Shavelson
 Michael Shonrock (born 1957)
 Lee Shulman
 Herbert A. Simon
 B. F. Skinner
 Victor Skumin (born 1948) 
 Robert Slavin
 Catherine E. Snow
 Charles Spearman
 Julian Stanley
 Robert Sternberg
 Deborah J. Stipek
 Patrick Suppes
 John Sweller

T 
 Lewis Terman
 Edward Thorndike
 Robert L. Thorndike
 David Tzuriel

V 
 Ernst von Glasersfeld (1917–2010)
 Lev Vygotsky

W 
 David Wechsler
 Bernard Weiner
 Cassandra B. Whyte
 William Winn
 Philip Winne

Z 
 Caroline Beaumont Zachry
 Barry Zimmerman

See also 
 List of educational theorists

Lists of social scientists
Psychology lists